Lunga Lunga is a constituency in Kenya. It is one of four constituencies in Kwale County.

References 

Constituencies in Kwale County